Kristel Moreno (born January 14, 1991) is a Filipino actress and dancer. A former child star and former Sexbomb Girl, she was relaunched as a member of Star Magic Batch 16.

Filmography

Film

Television

References

External links

Star Magic
1991 births
Living people
Filipino female dancers
SexBomb Girls members